Saint Ansanus (died 304 AD), called The Baptizer or The Apostle of Siena, is the patron saint of Siena, a scion of the Anician family of Rome.

Legend 
His legend states that he was born of a noble Roman family in the third century.  While still a child, Ansanus was secretly baptized by his nurse Maxima (venerated as St. Maxima of Rome) and was secretly brought up as a Christian. Ansanus openly declared his Christian faith during the persecutions of Diocletian, when he was nineteen years old. According to tradition, St. Ansanus preached the Gospel in Bagnoregio (then Bagnorea) and the church of Santa Maria delle Carceri outside the Alban Gate was said to have been built above the prison in which he was confined.

According to tradition, Ansanus and Maxima were scourged; Maxima died from this. Ansanus, however, survived this torture, as well as the next one: being thrown into a pot of boiling oil. He was then taken to the city of Siena as a prisoner. He managed to preach Christianity there and make many converts to this religion. He was decapitated by order of Roman Emperor Diocletian.

It is also said that his own father denounced him to the authorities, but Ansanus managed to escape, and converted many at Bagnorea and later at Siena.

Veneration
He was venerated as one of the patron saints of Siena.  He is depicted in the Maestà of Duccio.

References

Sources

External links
Saint of the Day, December 1: Ansanus the Baptizer at SaintPatrickDC.org
 Sant’Ansano di Siena
 "Saint Ansanus" at the Christian Iconography website

304 deaths
4th-century Christian martyrs
4th-century Romans
History of Siena
290s births
Christians martyred during the reign of Diocletian